Meilinger is a surname. Notable people with the surname include:

Marco Meilinger (born 1991), Austrian footballer
Melanie Meilinger (born 1991), Austrian freestyle skier
Phillip Meilinger (born 1948), United States Air Force officer and military historian
Steve Meilinger (1930–2015), American football player